Mount Discovery is a conspicuous, isolated stratovolcano, lying at the head of McMurdo Sound and east of Koettlitz Glacier, overlooking the NW portion of the Ross Ice Shelf. It forms the center of a three-armed mass of which Brown Peninsula is one extension to the north; Minna Bluff is a second to the east; the third is Mount Morning to the west. Mount Discovery was discovered by the British National Antarctic Expedition (1901–04) and named for their expedition ship Discovery.



See also
Eady Ice Piedmont
List of volcanoes in Antarctica
List of Ultras of Antarctica

References

Sources

External links

 "Mount Discovery, Antarctica" on Peakbagger

Stratovolcanoes of New Zealand
Mountains of Victoria Land
Volcanoes of Victoria Land
Pliocene stratovolcanoes
Pleistocene stratovolcanoes
Scott Coast